Hearts of the First Empire is an American two-reel silent film set during the Peninsular War of the First French Empire. It is thought to be lost.

Release
Hearts of the First Empire was released in the United States on April 28, 1913, in Toronto in early May, 1913, and was released in England on August 11, 1913. The film played in New Zealand in March, 1914, where it was screened alongside the contemporary drama Cinders, also made by Vitagraph. An Italian censorship document for the film was filed April 14, 1914.

References

External links
 

1913 films
1913 drama films
Silent American drama films
American black-and-white films
Films set in Paris
American silent short films
Films directed by William J. Humphrey
1910s American films